Barucha is a surname. Notable people with the surname include:

Andreas Barucha (born 1979), German bobsledder
Patrizia Barucha (born 1983), German footballer
Stefan Barucha (born 1977), German bobsledder

See also
Baruch (given name)
Bharucha